German submarine U-718 was a short-lived Type VIIC U-boat built by Nazi Germany's Kriegsmarine for service during World War II. Due to an accident  during training exercises five months after completion, U-718 never saw active service in the Kriegsmarine. Built at Hamburg during 1942 and 1943 and taking a year to complete, U-718 was a Type VIIC submarine and was intended for service in the Battle of the Atlantic.

Design
German Type VIIC submarines were preceded by the shorter Type VIIB submarines. U-718 had a displacement of  when at the surface and  while submerged. She had two shafts and two  propellers.

U-718 was fitted with five  torpedo tubes (four fitted at the bow and one at the stern), fourteen torpedoes, one  SK C/35 naval gun, 220 rounds, and two twin  C/30 anti-aircraft guns. The boat had a complement of between forty-four and sixty.

Service history
The submarines had been maneuvering to attack the same target in the dark, and U-476 ran aboard U-718 whilst the submarines were running on the surface. U-718s hatch was closed to prevent water entering the hull, and thus only the seven personnel in the conning tower, including Kapitänleutnant Wieduwilt, survived. The boat's hull was ruptured by the force of the impact, causing the submarine to fill and sink very rapidly, taking 43 sailors to the bottom with her. The survivors were rescued from the water by other German naval units and transferred to other boats.

References

Bibliography

External links

World War II submarines of Germany
German Type VIIC submarines
U-boats sunk in collisions
U-boats commissioned in 1943
U-boats sunk in 1943
U-boats sunk by German warships
World War II shipwrecks in the Baltic Sea
1943 ships
Ships built in Hamburg
Maritime incidents in November 1943